The Croatian Revolutionary Brotherhood (CRB) ( or HRB) was one of the extremist Croatian emigre groups formed in Australia in the early 1960s. The terrorist organisation was created by Croatian migrants to Australia from Yugoslavia after World War II, those who actively fought for the fascist Independent State of Croatia. The organisation carried out actions in Europe and Australia. The organisation was active throughout the territory of Yugoslavia in the early and mid 1960s. Its aim was to start an uprising in Yugoslavia and to establish an independent Croatia. This mission failed due to the intervention of the State Security Administration, the Yugoslav secret police.

Actions
 Belgrade cinema bombing in 1968
 Belgrade train station bombing in 1968
 Uprising attempt in Bugojno, 1972
 Action Kaktus; a sabotage attempt on the 1975 tourist season

Notable members

Some CRB members were:

Blaž Kraljević

 
These people were also members of Ante Pavelić's Croatian Liberation Movement (HOP) but they left that organisation because they decided they would not achieve their goals through the political route.

UDBA, the Yugoslav secret police, attempted to curb the group's terrorist activities by engaging in covert assassinations of its members. Geza Pašti was killed in Nice in 1965, and Marijan Šimundić was killed in Stuttgart in 1967.

The CRB/HRB's motto was: "Život za Hrvatsku" ["Life for Croatia"].

See also
Bugojno group
Croatian National Resistance
Croatian Revolution Hackers

Sources

Bibliography

1960s establishments in Australia
Australian people of Croatian descent
Croatian fascists
Croatian nationalist terrorism
Defunct organizations based in Croatia
Far-right politics in Australia
Organizations established in the 1960s
Ustaše
Revolutionary Brotherhood